Two partial lunar eclipses occurred in 1952: 

 11 February 1952 lunar eclipse
 5 August 1952 lunar eclipse

See also 
 List of 20th-century lunar eclipses
 Lists of lunar eclipses